Jefferson or Jéferson is a given name. Notable people with the name include:

Footballers
 Gauchinho (footballer, born 1983), full name Jéferson Lima de Menezes, Brazilian midfielder
 Jeferson Paulo Rodrigues de Souza (born 1981), Togolese footballer
 Jéferson (footballer, born 1984), full name Jéferson Rodrigues Gonçalves, Brazilian midfielder
Jéferson (footballer, born 1986), full name Jéferson Gomes do Nascimento, Brazilian goalkeeper
 Jefferson (footballer, born 1970), full name Jefferson Tomaz de Souza, Brazilian midfielder
Jefferson (footballer, born 1982), full name Jefferson Charles de Souza Pinto, Brazilian midfielder
 Jefferson (footballer, born 1983), full name Jefferson de Oliveira Galvão, Brazilian goalkeeper
 Jefferson (footballer, born January 1988), full name Jefferson Andrade Siqueira, Brazilian forward
Jefferson (footballer, born July 1988), full name Jefferson Moreira Nascimento, Brazilian defender
 Jefferson (footballer, born August 1988), full name Jefferson Lopes Faustino, Brazilian defender
Jefferson (footballer, born January 1989), full name Jefferson de Souza Leite, Brazilian midfielder
Jefferson (footballer, born 1997), full name Jefferson Junio Antonio da Silva, Brazilian defender
 Jefferson Batista (born 1976), Brazilian footballer	
 Jefferson Feijão (born 1978), full name Jefferson Marques da Conceição, Brazilian forward
 Jefferson Montero (born 1989), Ecuadorian midfielder
 Jefferson Nascimento (born 1988), Brazilian defender

Others 

Jefferson Byrd, American politician
Jefferson Davis (1808-1889), President of the Confederate States of America
Jefferson Davis (1862–1913), American state governor and US Senator
Jeferson Luis Gonçalo, Brazilian boxer
Jefferson Beauregard Sessions III, 84th United States Attorney General
Jefferson Stafford, American politician
Jefferson Vargas, Colombian cyclist
Jefferson Wood, American illustrator

Fictional characters
Jefferson D'Arcy, a character in the television show Married... with Children
 U.N. Jefferson, a character in the Revenge of the Nerds movie series

See also
Jefferson (surname)
Jeffrey, the origin of surname Jefferson

English masculine given names
Lists of people by given name